The Barn Owl Trust is a charity located at Waterleat, Ashburton, Devon, England. It aims to conserve the barn owl and its environment. It was established in 1988. The Barn Owl Trust has carried out a study of the death toll caused by road accidents. Its postcode is TQ13 7HU.

References

External links 
 Devon.gov
 Charity Commission page for the Barn Owl Trust
 BBC News - Barn Owl Trust in West Cornwall

Charities based in Devon